David Linton may refer to:

 David Linton (geographer) (1906–1971), British geographer
 David Linton (judge) (1815–1889), American judge